List of events in 2016 in eSports (also known as professional gaming).

Calendar of events

Leagues

Tournaments

References

 
Esports by year